Carla V. Rothlin is an Argentinian immunologist and Dorys McConnell Duberg Professor of Immunobiology and Professor of Pharmacology at Yale University in New Haven, Connecticut. Rothlin is also the co-leader of the Cancer Immunology Program at Yale Cancer Center as well as an Howard Hughes Medical Investigator faculty scholar. Rothlin studies the mechanisms that regulate immune homeostasis and wound repair, with specific interests in cell death recognition, immune checkpoints, and cellular crosstalk in the context of injury and cell turnover. She has made fundamental discoveries about the roles of TAM receptors tyrosine kinase and their ligands in the regulation of inflammation. Rothlin is also a co-founder of the Global Immunotalks, a weekly series of virtual Zoom lectures started in 2020 that brings together scientists from around the world to listen to cutting-edge immunology research from leaders in the field.

Early life and education 
Rothlin grew up in Buenos Aires, Argentina. She was one of four girls, raised by her mother, a physician, and her father, a pharmacology researcher. Rothlin was surrounded by laboratory science and clinical cases from a young age.

After high school, Rothlin chose to major in biochemistry for her undergraduate degree at the University of Buenos Aires. Rothlin stayed at the University of Buenos Aires for her graduate degree in biochemistry. She was mentored by Ana Belén Elgoyhen and studied the biochemical properties of the nicotinic acetylcholine receptors in the inner ear. Her work helped further our understanding of how efferent cholinergic fibers and inner ear hair cells communicate to relay information from the brain back to the ear to mediate sensory tuning.

Rothlin completed her graduate studies in 2002 and moved to San Diego, California for her postdoctoral work. She was still drawn to neurobiology so she chose to study under Greg Lemke at the Salk Institute for Biological Studies. Once there, she became fascinated by TAM receptors, which Lemke had discovered in the 1990s, and their roles in immune homeostasis. She then decided to switch her path and study immunology in her postdoc.

During her postdoc, Rothlin was part of a team that discovered the role of TAM receptor tyrosine kinases, Tyro3, Axl, and MerTk, in the regulation of inflammation. They found that Tyro3, Axl, and MerTk inhibit Toll-like receptor (TLR) and TLR-induced cytokine cascades in the innate immune response. Specifically, cytokine-dependent TAM signalling is upregulated by type I interferon-STAT1 signalling leading to expression of cytokine and TLR suppressors, acting in an inflammatory negative feedback loops.

Career and research 
In 2009, Rothlin was recruited to Yale University, where she started a lab with her partner from Salk, Sourav Ghosh. Rothlin started as Assistant Professor of Immunobiology at Yale, and in 2016 became a Howard Hughes Medical Institute Faculty. In 2018, Rothlin became director of Graduate Studies in Immunobiology at Yale. In 2019, Rothlin was appointed Dorys McConnell Duberg Professor of Immunobiology. She is also a Professor of Pharmacology as well as a member of the Yale Cancer Center and Co-Leader of the Cancer Immunology Program at Yale.

Rothlin is a co-director of the Rothlin Ghosh Lab which focuses on exploring the mechanisms of immune regulation and homeostasis. The Rothlin Gosh lab has made critical discoveries regarding TAM receptor tyrosine kinases, their ligands and the role their interactions serve as innate immune checkpoints in the regulation of the immune response. They have specifically found that TAMs help to inhibit the innate immune response, that TAM ligand, protein S, can mediate the ability of T cells to limit dendritic cell activation, and their roles in control of type 2 immunity and phagocytosis of apoptotic cells.

TAM receptors and immune homeostasis 
Rothlin and her team discovered a mechanism by which the adaptive immune system helps to regulate chronic inflammation through controlling dendritic cells (DCs). They found that T cells produce the TAM ligand, protein S, that acts on TAMs on DCs to limit the extent of their activation. When they knocked out the Pros1 gene, encoding protein S, in T cells, they found an enhanced immune response and increased colitis. They further proved that this mechanism of immune regulation in conserved in humans as well. They further showed a mechanism by which viruses can take advantage of the TAM mediated immune regulation to avoid destruction. They found that viruses coated with TAM ligands activate TAMs on dendritic cells which limits interferon signalling to help evade immune responses and enable replication. Since they also showed that inhibiting TAM receptors can promote resistance to infection, this could be used as a therapeutic target for viral induced diseases. In 2015, Rothlin's group characterized MERTK as a potent inhibitor of T cell activation through its interactions with Pros1 ligand in humans.

Innate immune checkpoints in cancer 
Rothlin's lab also explores the role TAMs play in cellular immunology and innate immune checkpoints in cancer. Immune checkpoint blockade therapy has historically focused on the adaptive immune system, blocking the cellular breaking system on T cells (such as CTLA-4 and PD-1 inhibitors) to enhance immunogenicity of the tumor microenvironment and cytotoxicity tumor infiltrating cells. Rothlin and her team are working upstream of T cell exhaustion markers, at the level of the innate immune system checkpoints which involve TAMs. Since Rothlin found that TAMs help to mediate the repair and regrowth aspect of the innate immune response, blocking these molecules holds promise to keep the immune system in an inflammatory or defensive state to promote anti-tumor immunity.

In collaboration with Miriam Merad’s group, Rothlin and her team found that Axl signalling induces the expression of PD-L1 on dendritic cells in the tumor environment, supporting the TAM receptor pathway as an upstream target for immunotherapy. In 2017, Rothlin and her team showed further roles of Axl in tumor growth. They found that Axl expression is upregulated in colorectal cancer and that limiting Axl expression prevented tumor cell migration and invasion. They also found that Axl plays a role in B cell migration to tertiary lymphoid structures in cancer, and blocking Axl signalling limits B cell migration.

Scientific outreach 
Rothlin aims to improve her scientific community through her day to day leadership roles and outreach projects. Rothlin is a committee member for the Minority Affairs Committee for the American Association of Immunologists. She is also a senior editor for Immunology and Inflammation at Elife. Rothlin is also the co-founder of the Global Immunotalks Lectures, which she started in 2020 along with her colleague, friend, and fellow immunologist Elina Zúñiga in an effort to make cutting-edge immunology accessible to a global audience without the need for travel. Rothlin and Zúñiga invited a world renowned immunologist to share their newest findings with a global audience over Zoom every Wednesday, and since the talks are recorded and posted to YouTube, they can be watched for years to come. Rothlin and Zúñiga were also motivated to implement these talks as a way to increase the opportunities for access to the latest discoveries in an egalitarian manner. They know from firsthand experience in Argentina that not everyone has access to the seminars and conferences that some laboratories do. Global Immunotalks proved to be very successful at bringing people together virtually during the COVID-19 pandemic. The event was so successful, the series is being continued into 2021.

Awards and honors 

 2020 Career Enhancement Program and Developmental Research Program Awards
 2016 Howard Hughes Medical Institute Faculty Scholar
 2011 Early Excellence Award – American Asthma Foundation
 2011 Novel Research Grant – Lupus Research Institute
 2010 Senior Research Award – Crohn's and Colitis Foundation of America
 2008 Special Fellow – Leukemia and Lymphoma Society
 2008 Scientist Development Award – American Heart Association
 2002 Pew Foundation Fellow 
 2002 Bernardo Houssay Award – Sociedad Argentina de Biologia

Select publications 

 Bosurgi L, Cao YG, Cabeza-Cabrerizo M, Tucci A, Hughes LD, Kong Y, Weinstein JS, Licona-Limon P, Schmid ET, Pelorosso F, Gagliani N, Craft JE, Flavell RA, Ghosh S, Rothlin CV. Macrophage function in tissue repair and remodeling requires IL-4 or IL-13 with apoptotic cells. Science. 2017 Jun 9;356(6342):1072–1076. doi: 10.1126/science.aai8132. Epub 2017 May 11. ; PMCID: PMC5556699.
 Schmid ET, Pang IK, Carrera Silva EA, Bosurgi L, Miner JJ, Diamond MS, Iwasaki A, Rothlin CV. AXL receptor tyrosine kinase is required for T cell priming and antiviral immunity. Elife. 2016 Jun 28;5:e12414. doi: 10.7554/eLife.12414. ; PMCID: PMC4924996.
 Chan PY, Carrera Silva EA, De Kouchkovsky D, Joannas LD, Hao L, Hu D, Huntsman S, Eng C, Licona-Limón P, Weinstein JS, Herbert DR, Craft JE, Flavell RA, Repetto S, Correale J, Burchard EG, Torgerson DG, Ghosh S, Rothlin CV. The TAM family receptor tyrosine kinase TYRO3 is a negative regulator of type 2 immunity. Science. 2016 Apr 1;352(6281):99–103. doi: 10.1126/science.aaf1358. ; PMCID: PMC4935984.
 Kusne Y, Carrera-Silva EA, Perry AS, Rushing EJ, Mandell EK, Dietrich JD, Errasti AE, Gibbs D, Berens ME, Loftus JC, Hulme C, Yang W, Lu Z, Aldape K, Sanai N, Rothlin CV, Ghosh S. Targeting aPKC disables oncogenic signaling by both the EGFR and the proinflammatory cytokine TNFα in glioblastoma. Sci Signal. 2014 Aug 12;7(338):ra75. doi: 10.1126/scisignal.2005196. ; PMCID: PMC4486020.
 Rothlin CV, Leighton JA, Ghosh S. Tyro3, Axl, and Mertk receptor signaling in inflammatory bowel disease and colitis-associated cancer. Inflamm Bowel Dis. 2014 Aug;20(8):1472-80. doi: 10.1097/MIB.0000000000000050. ; PMCID: PMC4343000.
 Rothlin CV, Ghosh S, Zuniga EI, Oldstone MB, Lemke G. TAM receptors are pleiotropic inhibitors of the innate immune response. Cell. 2007 Dec 14;131(6):1124-36. doi: 10.1016/j.cell.2007.10.034. .
 Rothlin CV, Lioudyno MI, Silbering AF, Plazas PV, Casati ME, Katz E, Guth PS, Elgoyhen AB. Direct interaction of serotonin type 3 receptor ligands with recombinant and native alpha 9 alpha 10-containing nicotinic cholinergic receptors. Mol Pharmacol. 2003 May;63(5):1067–74. doi: 10.1124/mol.63.5.1067. .

References 

Living people
Women immunologists
Year of birth missing (living people)